Appel de Blois is an initiative in 2008 by Liberté pour l’Histoire to work against legislative authorities criminalizing the past through the legislative, thus putting more and more obstacles in the way of historical research. It was signed by historians such as Carlo Ginzburg, Eric Hobsbawn, and Jacques Le Goff. The appeal, which was directed at the European public, particularly scholars, historians, and academics, called for the rejection of "moralisation" and "judicialisation" of history through the codification of the so-called memory laws.  

The initiative asks people to sign up under this:

References

External links
 Appel de Blois (english version)
 The freedom of historical debate is under attack by the memory police (The Guardian, 16 October 2008. Egalement paru dans La Repubblica, El Pais et The Los Angeles Times, norwegian translation in Dagbladet) in The Guardian by professor Timothy Garton Ash
 Point de vue Appel de Blois in Le Monde 

History organizations based in France